Morgan Parra (born 15 November 1988) is a French rugby union player who plays as a Scrum-half and occasionally Fly-half. He plays for Stade Français in the Top 14. He played most of his career with Clermont Auvergne after signing for them from Bourgoin. He is of Portuguese origin through his father, Antonio.

Career

Parra started playing rugby aged four for Metz. He made his debut for France aged 19 as a replacement against Scotland in the 2008 Six Nations Championship, making his first start for France in a defeat to England at the Stade de France. He is also a front-line goal-kicker, having taken on the mantle at Test level.

At club level Parra came to prominence with Top 14 strugglers Bourgoin, before moving to heavyweights Clermont Auvergne in 2009 replacing Pierre Mignoni and striking up a strong partnership with Australian fly-half Brock James.

In 2010 Parra was instrumental in guiding France to a Six Nations Grand Slam. He was picked partly after Julien Dupuy who was first choice in the 2009 autumn internationals was banned for eye gouging. After being paired with the equally youthful François Trinh-Duc at half-back, he produced a number of masterful performances, including a rout of reigning champions Ireland at the Stade de France.

After the Grand Slam Parra's fame and popularity rose in France, and is popular not just at his club but a darling to the French media and public.

On 23 October 2021 Parra completes a record series of 48 successful penalty kicks in a row against Pau.

On 5 June 2022 Parra played his last match for Clermont Auvergne as he signed to play for State Francais from 2022 onwards.

Style

Parra is known as a particularly vocal leader of the pack and is known in France as the petit général. He is a reliable kicker.

Honours

Club

Clermont
 
Top 14 Winner (2): 2010,2017

European Rugby Challenge Cup Winner: 2019

International

France

Six Nations Winner: 2010

Grand Slam Winner: 2010

Rugby World Cup Runner Up: 2011

References

External links
 
RBS 6 Nations profile

Living people
1988 births
French rugby union players
ASM Clermont Auvergne players
Stade Français players
France international rugby union players
French people of Portuguese descent
Rugby union scrum-halves
Sportspeople from Metz